is the ninth Japanese single release from Hitomi Yaida. It is also the first single taken from the album Air/Cook/Sky. It was used as the drama Densetsu no Madam's theme song.  It was also on the soundtrack of Rugrats Go to Tokyo.

It reached number six in the charts on May 3, 2003.

Track listing

Notes

2003 singles
Hitomi Yaida songs
Japanese television drama theme songs
2003 songs
Songs written by Hitomi Yaida